Padthaway is a small town in the Australian state of South Australia located in the state's south-east within the Limestone Coast region about  south east of the state capital of Adelaide and about  south-east of the municipal seat of Bordertown. The name is derived from the Potawurutj, the Aboriginal name word for cover or bury. Padthaway is in the Tatiara District Council, the state electorate of MacKillop and the federal Division of Barker.

The 2016 Australian census which was conducted in August 2016 reports that Padthaway had a population of 418 people.

History
Padthaway was the name of the original pastoral station which was established on Bodaruwitj Aboriginal lands in this area in 1847 by a successful Scottish businessman, Robert Lawson. In 1882 the Padthaway Estate Homestead was built by Eliza and Robert Lawson. The historic Padthaway Estate complex is listed on the South Australian Heritage Register.

In 1952 Padthaway became the centre of a soldier settlement scheme. The first vineyards were planted here in 1964 and quickly transformed marginal grazing land into a top wine-producing region. White wines, especially, from the region are regular winners of major awards. These wines may be purchased at the local cellar door sales and at wine retailers around Australia. Agriculture is also strong in Padthaway with onion, olives and seeds being grown along with sheep and cattle which are reared for sale.

Padthaway has a cluster of businesses located in the heart of town including a deli, general store, two rural service centres, an auto and engineering centre, a caravan park, and a park with a playground in the main street, Memorial Drive.

Other public amenities include netball and tennis courts, football oval, town hall, sports complex, medical clinic, playground, skate park and rotunda. The toilets are right near the playground. In 2010 a new medical clinic was built.

The conservation park has stands of yellow gum, ribbon gum, brown stringybark, manna gums, many acacias and banksias. It is also home to a variety of animals including koalas, birds, rabbits, kangaroos and many insects. Sometimes the rare fire orchid may be viewed in flower.

Wine region

Padthaway is also the name of a wine region surrounding the town. It is home to several large commercial vineyards. The oldest vineyard was established in 1964 by Seppelts, with Lindeman's, Hardys and Wynns also establishing vineyards in the 1960s. There are only a few cellar doors operating in the region.

Sports 
Records for lawn bowls being played in Padthaway go back to 1963. Lawn bowls is played in Padthaway on Saturday during the summer time. Padthaway bowling club plays in the Upper South East association.

The last A grade cricket premiership Padthaway won was in 1993. Padthaway has had a B grade side most years since. Padthaway came fifth in the competition in 2010–2011. In 2011 there was only one competition, an A grade side.

Netball has been played in Padthaway since the mid-late 1960s. In 2011 the Padthaway Netball Club, also called the Lions, has more than seven different teams for netball.

The Padthaway Football Club which commenced in 1967 is known as the Lions and is the main club of the town, competing in the Kowree-Naracoorte-Tatiara Football League. The football club won an A grade premiership grand final in 1993 against Bordertown.

The Padthaway Tennis Club dates back to 1962 and 1972 when the club laid new concrete courts. The Padthaway Tennis club won many premierships between the mid-1970s and into the late 1980s. Tennis is currently played as a social competition on Wednesday nights for a six-eight-week season in the summer before Christmas.

The Padthaway golf course is carved out of scrubland. This tight course is a challenge even for the most professional of golfers. The Padthaway golf club was opened in 1988 and has 9 holes with scrapes.

The community 
Apex is a community group which operates in Padthaway composed of men between the ages of 18 and 45 who work together to promote social justice and raise awareness of charity causes by fundraising in interesting and creative ways.

Padthaway has an active Women in Agricultural Business group. WAB is a statewide network with branches throughout SA. It is an organisation for women interested in rural, agricultural and business issues. It provides the opportunity for self-development and friendship.

Schools
The school was built in 1935 and had its 75-year anniversary in 2010. The event was attended by many past, current and future students and staff and a time capsule was buried on the day. In 2011 Padthaway Primary School had 52 students and 12 staff members. Padthaway Primary School caters for years Reception-7 and also has a Child Parent Centre (CPC). At Padthaway Primary School the Student Representative Council (SRC) organises many fundraising activities for students to participate in.

Padthaway Primary School is a school with many activities for students such as the Come out, SAPSASA, Youth Environmental Forum, pancake day, Student Young Leaders Day and school camp. SAPSASA events include football, netball, cricket, tennis, cross country, athletics running events, swimming, diving, golf, hockey and skiing.

Climate

References

Towns in South Australia
Limestone Coast
Australian soldier settlements